Potsdam is a town in St. Lawrence County, New York, United States. The town population was 14,901 at the 2020 census. The ZIP Code is 13676. When SUNY Potsdam and Clarkson University are in session, the population increases by approximately 8,000 students. The town is named after the city of Potsdam in Germany. 
The town of Potsdam also contains a village named Potsdam.  Potsdam is centrally located within the county and northeast of Canton, the county seat.

History 

David Clarkson and Garret van Horn were early investors in the town, and settlement began around 1803. The newcomers found Native Americans residing in the town and in the fur trade.

The town was established in 1806 from part of the Town of Madrid. Potsdam is one of the original ten towns of St. Lawrence County.

The community of Potsdam set itself apart from the town in 1831 by incorporating as a village. The community of Raquetteville incorporated as the Village of Potsdam Junction (now Norwood) in 1871.

St. Lawrence Academy, the predecessor of the State University of New York at Potsdam was founded in 1816. In 1896, Clarkson University was founded.

The Potsdam area is well known for its reddish-orange Potsdam sandstone. A large slab of it is on display at the Smithsonian Institution in Washington, D.C.

The First Presbyterian Church of Dailey Ridge and French Family Farm are listed on the National Register of Historic Places.

Geography
According to the United States Census Bureau, the town has an area of 103.4 square miles (267.9 km2), of which 101.5 square miles (262.8 km2)  is land and 2.0 square miles (5.2 km2)  (1.92%) is water.

The Raquette River flows northward through the town's center. The Grasse River flows through the northwestern part of Potsdam.

Transportation
U.S. Route 11 and New York State Route 11B are east–west highways. New York State Route 56 is a north–south highway. New York State Route 345 is a northwest–southeast highway that intersects New York State Route 310 near the northwestern town line.

The New York Central Railroad's St. Lawrence Division runs through the town. Until 1964 the New York Central operated passenger trains from Massena, through the town, to Watertown, and to Syracuse to meet up with the NYC mainline.

Climate

Demographics

As of the census of 2020, there were 14,901 people and 4,988 households in the town. The population density was 158.2 people per square mile (61.1/km2).  The racial makeup of the town was 86.4% non-Hispanic White, 4.3% Black or African American, 0.6% Native American, 2.7% Asian, 0.1% Pacific Islander, 0.36% from other races, and 2.4% from two or more races. Hispanic or Latino of any race were 3.9% of the population.

There were 4,988 households, out of which 27.4% had children under the age of 18 living with them, 42.5% were married couples living together, 9.6% had a female householder with no husband present, and 44.6% were non-families. 31.8% of all households were made up of individuals, and 11.4% had someone living alone who was 65 years of age or older.  The average household size was 2.17 and the average family size was 2.97.

In the town, the population was spread out, with 13.4% under the age of 18, 36.8% from 18 to 24, 19.9% from 25 to 44, 16.2% from 45 to 64, and 11.7% who were 65 years of age or older. The median age was 23 years. The town was 48.6% female and 51.4% male.

The median income for a household in the town was $57,977.  The per capita income for the town was $23,747. About 19.3% of the population were below the poverty line.

Local schools and universities

The town of Potsdam consists of the Potsdam Central School District, which includes an elementary school (Lawrence Avenue), a middle school (A.A. Kingston), and a high school (Potsdam High School). The high school is the home of the Potsdam Sandstoners.

There are four universities in the area, including SUNY Potsdam (which is known for its Crane School of Music) and Clarkson University (a private research university known for engineering and business) in Potsdam, as well as both St. Lawrence University and SUNY Canton in nearby Canton.

Communities and locations in the Town of Potsdam 

Bucks Bridge − a hamlet in the northwestern corner of the town at the Grass River. The Buck's Bridge Community Church was listed on the National Register of Historic Places in 2004 as the Buck's Bridge United Methodist Church.
Burnhams Corners − a location on NY-345 at County Road 35, northwest of Potsdam village.
Casey Corners − a location on County Road 34 in the western part of the town.
Clarkson University − a private university, southwest of Potsdam village.
Crary Mills − a hamlet.
Hewittville – a hamlet on the western bank of the Raquette River, north of Potsdam village.
Norwood − southern part of the Village of Norwood is by the northern town line on NY-56; formerly called "Raquetteville" and "Potsdam Junction".
Norwood Lake – reservoir southwest of Norwood.
Potsdam − Village of Potsdam on the Raquette River.
Potsdam Municipal Airport - Damon Field (PTD) − small airport east of Potsdam village.
Sissonville − a small hamlet on NY-56 north of Potsdam village.
Slab City − a location on County Road 35 is in the western part of the town and south of West Potsdam.
Stafford Corners − a location south of Potsdam village at the southeastern town line.
SUNY Potsdam − a state college southeast of Potsdam village.
Sugar Island − a location in the Raquette River, south of Potsdam village.
Unionville − a hamlet north of Potsdam village on NY-56; site of one of the first cooperative settlements in New York. Membership included several relatives of Mormonism leader Joseph Smith, including his uncle John Smith.
West Potsdam − a hamlet on County Road 34 in the western part of the town, formerly known as "Smiths Corners", known for its gun shows. In 2022, the scheduled February show was cancelled due to the prior shooting death of a SUNY Potsdam student.

Radio
 1340 WMSA
 WRCD-FM 101.5 the Fox
 WSNN-FM 99.3
 WTSC-FM 91.1 the Source
 WVLF-FM Mix 96.1

Television
 WNPI-DT, a full-power WPBS-TV rebroadcaster in South Colton, primarily serves Ottawa. 
 WWNY-CD, a low-power WWNY (CBS/Fox) retransmitter, is on WNPI's tower.

Notable people

Gigolo Aunts, alternative rock band that formed in Potsdam during the mid-1980s.
Lucinda Banister Chandler (1828-1911), social reformer and author
Craig Conroy, professional hockey player (retired)
Wes Craven, film director, educator and creator of the "Nightmare on Elm Street" and "Scream" series. Taught at Clarkson
John Gerrish, music professor and American composer
David A. Kyle, noted science fiction fan, author and publisher
Trevor Scott, professional football player
Jason Sutter, professional drummer, currently playing for Marilyn Manson
Jeff Thacher, percussionist of the band Rockapella
George A. Smith, early leader in the Latter Day Saint movement.
John Lyman Smith, Utah Territorial Legislator
Jason Liang, chess player

Bibliography

References

External links
Potsdam Town Site
 Potsdam Village Site

Towns in St. Lawrence County, New York
1831 establishments in New York (state)
Populated places established in 1831